As a topic of chemistry, chemical synthesis (or combination) is the artificial execution of chemical reactions to obtain one or several products. This occurs by physical and chemical manipulations usually involving one or more reactions. In modern laboratory uses, the process is reproducible and reliable.

A chemical synthesis involves one or more compounds (known as reagents or reactants) that will experience a transformation when subjected to certain conditions. Various reaction types can be applied to formulate a desired product. This requires mixing the compounds in a reaction vessel, such as a chemical reactor or a simple round-bottom flask. Many reactions require some form of processing ("work-up") or purification procedure to isolate the final product.

The amount produced by chemical synthesis is known as the reaction yield. Typically, yields are expressed as a mass in grams (in a laboratory setting) or as a percentage of the total theoretical quantity that could be produced based on the limiting reagent. A side reaction is an unwanted chemical reaction occurring which reduces the desired yield. The word synthesis was used first in a chemical context by the chemist Hermann Kolbe.

Strategies
Many strategies exist in chemical synthesis that are more complicated than simply converting a reactant A to a reaction product B directly. For multistep synthesis, a chemical compound is synthesized by a series of individual chemical reactions, each with its own work-up. For example, a laboratory synthesis of paracetamol can consist of three sequential parts. For cascade reactions, multiple chemical transformations occur within a single reactant, for multi-component reactions as many as 11 different reactants form a single reaction product and for a "telescopic synthesis" one reactant experiences multiple transformations without isolation of intermediates.

Organic synthesis

Organic synthesis is a special type of chemical synthesis dealing with the synthesis of organic compounds. For the total synthesis of a complex product, multiple procedures in sequence may be required to synthesize the product of interest, requiring a large amount of time. Skill in organic synthesis is prized among chemists and the synthesis of exceptionally valuable or difficult compounds has won chemists such as Robert Burns Woodward a Nobel Prize for Chemistry. If a chemical synthesis starts from basic laboratory compounds, it is considered a purely synthetic process. If it starts from a product isolated from plants or animals and then proceeds to new compounds, the synthesis is described as a semisynthetic process.

Inorganic synthesis
Inorganic synthesis and organometallic synthesis are applied to the preparation of compounds with significant non-organic content. An illustrative example is the preparation of the anti-cancer drug cisplatin from potassium tetrachloroplatinate.

See also

 Beilstein database
 Chemical engineering
 Click chemistry
 Electrosynthesis
 Methods in Organic Synthesis
 Organic synthesis
 Peptide synthesis
 Total synthesis
 Automated synthesis

References

External links
 The Organic Synthesis Archive
 Natural product syntheses

 
Chemistry